Adekugbe is a Nigerian surname. Notable people with the surname include:

 Sam Adekugbe (born 1995), Canadian professional soccer player
 Elijah Adekugbe (born 1996), English professional footballer 

Surnames of Nigerian origin